Johann Gottfried Niedlich (5 September 1766, Berlin - 12 August 1837, Berlin) was a German painter, illustrator and art teacher.

Biography
He studied in Berlin at the Prussian Academy of Arts with Bernhard Rode and Johann Christoph Frisch. He found employment as a teacher at a local drawing school in 1789. From 1795 to 1800, he lived in Italy, then returned to Berlin.

In 1801, he was appointed a Professor and member of the Senate at the Academy and, after 1812, was personally in charge of all the drawing lessons. He had several notable students, including Eduard Daege, Carl Georg Enslen,  and Theodor Hildebrandt.

In addition to his work as a teacher, from 1800 to 1824 he created several large oil paintings on mythological subjects. In 1802, he created ceiling paintings at the City Palace, Potsdam. In 1818, following a fire at the Schauspielhaus Berlin, he participated in reconstructive work by providing allegorical wall paintings. He also did decorative paintings for Charlottenburg Palace.

His cast-iron grave cross has been preserved, and is the oldest cross of its type in the cemetery.

References

 Biography @ the Allgemeine Deutsche Biographie

Further reading 
 Blätter für bildende Kunst, published by Dr. F. Kugler. #5, Berlin 1837, pg.277. (Obituary by Carl Friedrich Hampe)

External links 

 Entry in the Neues allgemeines Künstler-Lexicon Vol.10 @ Google Books
 Entry in the Morgenblatt für gebildete Leser, Vol. 31 @ Google Books

1766 births
1837 deaths
18th-century German painters
18th-century German male artists
Decorative arts
Prussian Academy of Arts alumni
Academic staff of the Prussian Academy of Arts
Artists from Berlin
19th-century German painters
19th-century German male artists